Pratz may refer to:

Places
Pratz, Luxembourg, a town in Luxembourg
Pratz, Jura, a commune in the department of Jura in France

People with the surname
Albert Pratz (1914–1995), Canadian classical violinist, conductor, composer and music educator